Michael Whittaker may refer to:

Michael Whittaker (costume designer) (1918–1995), British costume designer and actor
Michael Whittaker (rowing) (born 1970), New Zealand coxswain
Michael Whittaker (gymnast) in 1984 Trampoline World Championships
Michael Whittaker (aircraft designer) creator of the Whittaker MW5 Sorcerer and Whittaker MW6

See also
Michael Whitaker (disambiguation)